Brent Wilkes may refer to:

Brent A. Wilkes (born 1966), executive director of LULAC
Brent R. Wilkes (born 1954), American defense contractor